Christopher James Siddall (born 11 December 1979, Sheffield, Yorkshire, England) is an English cricketer.  Siddall is a left-handed batsman who bowls right-arm off break.

Siddall represented the Yorkshire Cricket Board in a single List A match against Huntingdonshire in the second round of the 2000 NatWest Trophy.  In his only List A match, he scored five runs.

References

External links
Christopher Siddall at Cricinfo

1979 births
Living people
Cricketers from Sheffield
English cricketers
Yorkshire Cricket Board cricketers
English cricketers of the 21st century